The Challenger ATP Iquique was a professional tennis tournament played on outdoor red clay courts. It was part of the Association of Tennis Professionals (ATP) Challenger Tour. It was held in Iquique, Chile in 2009.

Past finals

Singles

Doubles

External links
Official website
ITF search

ATP Challenger Tour
Clay court tennis tournaments
Tennis tournaments in Chile
Recurring sporting events established in 2009
Iquique